Abigail (died December 1783), called Abby, was an African American woman owned as a slave by the American statesman John Jay. She died after attempting to escape in 1783 in Paris, where Jay helped negotiate the Treaty of Paris to secure America's independence.

Abigail belonged to the Jay household since at least 1776; she was one of at least 17 slaves owned by Jay. In 1779, she was the only slave to accompany Jay and his family on their trip to Paris. When he left Paris for London in 1783, his family and Abigail remained in Paris. His wife Sarah regularly wrote to him about the household's affairs, and it is from this correspondence that almost all that is known about Abigail is drawn.

While Sarah's letters initially praised "Abbe"'s "attention & proofs of fidelity" and her "usefulness", she was isolated in Paris, with few friends or opportunity to make any, and separated from her loved ones in America. In summer of 1783, she suffered from toothache and rheumatism. By then, it appears that she felt unsettled; Sarah suggested that an "English washerwoman" might have enticed Abigail with the promise of wages in exchange for her work.

In October 1783, Abigail left the Jay home, intending not to return. At Sarah Jay's request, the Paris police searched for Abigail, and found her in the English washerwoman's company. By lettre de cachet, she was detained in La Petite Force, the women's wing of the city jail, the Hôtel de la Force. But she refused to return to the Jays unless she was promised passage back to America.

Jay reacted with pique to Abigail's escape attempt, writing that he could not "conceive a motive" for it, given that, he wrote, he "had promised to manumit her upon our return to America, provided she behaved properly in the meantime." He wished for her to be "punished, though not vigorously", and on the advice of Benjamin Franklin, he suggested that she be left in prison for 15 to 20 days to change her mind: "Little minds cannot bear attentions & to Persons of that Class they should rather be granted than offered." To his biographer Walter Stahr, this reaction indicates that "however much [Jay] disliked slavery in the abstract, he could not understand why one of his slaves would run away."

While imprisoned, Abigail fell ill, and asked to be allowed back to the Jays. William Franklin arranged her release by paying 60 livres to the jail, probably to cover her meals. Still sick, she was cared for by Sarah Jay, but died about two weeks after her release from prison. No grave, nor records or signs of her life remain.

References 

African-American women
1783 deaths
18th-century American slaves

Year of birth unknown